The Federation Walk Coastal Reserve is a reserve comprising the eastern part of The Spit on the Gold Coast, Queensland, Australia. The reserve was opened on 22 June 2003, and is approximately 93 hectares in size. The area supports a subtle mix of habitats including littoral rainforest, native grasslands, and pockets of wetlands. The Federation Walk track goes throughout the reserve.

Flora

Coastal banksia (Banksia integrifolia)
Old man banksia (Banksia serrata)
Swamp banksia (Banksia robur)
Beach bean (Canavalia rosea)
Weeping bottlebrush (Callistemon viminalis)
Dune cypress
Dune fan flower
Marsh fern (Cyclosorus interruptus)
Weeping fig (Ficus benjamina)
Beach morning glory
Variable groundsel
Forest red gum (Eucalyptus tereticornis)
Red flowering gum (Corymbia ficifolia)
Cottonwood hibiscus (Hibiscus tiliaceus)
Native beach hibiscus (Hibiscus tiliaceus)
Blush macaranga (Macaranga tanarius)
Spiny-head mat-rush (Lomandra longifolia)
Swamp oak (Casuarina glauca)
Bangalow palm (Archontophoenix cunninghamiana)
Cabbage-tree palm (Livistona australis)
Pigface (Carpobrotus glaucescens)
Knobby-club rush (Ficinia nodosa)
She-oak (Casuarina equisetifolia)
Tuckeroo (Cupaniopsis anacardioides)
Coastal wattle (Acacia sophorae)

Fauna

Striped marsh frog
Eastern sedge frog
Green tree frog (Litoria caerulea)
Carpet python
Eastern water dragon

Birds

Rainbow bee-eater
Australian brushturkey
Butcherbird
Pied butcherbird
Golden-headed cisticola
Little black cormorant
Pheasant coucal
Torresian crow
Black-faced cuckooshrike
Bush stone-curlew
Far Eastern curlew
Pied currawong
Dollarbird
Bar-shouldered dove
Spotted dove
Spangled drongo
Pacific black duck
Little eagle
White-bellied sea eagle
Red-backed fairywren
Superb fairywren
Grey fantail
Australasian figbird
Double-barred finch
Leaden flycatcher
Noisy friarbird
Tawny frogmouth
Galah
Bar-tailed godwit
Silver gull
Striated heron
White-faced heron
Blue-faced honeyeater
Brown honeyeater
Striped honeyeater
Straw-necked ibis
Sacred kingfisher
Black-shouldered kite
Brahminy kite
Whistling kite
Kookaburra
Masked lapwing
Rainbow lorikeet
Scaly-breasted lorikeet
Australian magpie
Noisy miner
Mistletoebird
Scarlet myzomela
Olive-backed oriole
Osprey
Australian pelican
Australian pipit
Double-banded plover
Brown quail
Buff-banded rail
Silvereye
Welcome swallow
Common tern
Greater crested tern
Yellow-rumped thornbill
Willie wagtail
Whimbrel

References

Tourist attractions on the Gold Coast, Queensland
Nature reserves in Queensland